Sefid Dasht may refer to:
 Sefid Dasht, Ardabil, a village in Ardabil Province, Iran
 Sefid Dasht, Lorestan, a village in Lorestan Province, Iran
 Sefiddasht, a city in Chaharmahal and Bakhtiari Province, Iran
 Sepiddasht, a city in Lorestan Province, Iran
 Sepiddasht, Alborz, a village in Alborz Province, Iran
 Sefiddasht Rural District, in Isfahan Province, Iran